Johannes Erath (born 1975) is a German opera director.

Career 
Erath was born in 1975 in Rottweil. First he studied violin with Rainer Küchl at der University of Music and Performing Arts, Vienna and with  Hansheinz Schneeberger in Freiburg. He worked as an orchestra musician at the Volksoper Wien and at the Orchesterakademie of the Vienna Philharmonic. Thereafter he decided to go toward directing. First he served as an assistant to Willy Decker, Peter Konwitschny and Graham Vick in theaters all over Europe. 2002 he became Stage Manager at the Hamburg State Opera.

Among the early productions of Erath were mostly operas by contemporary composers — i.e. the world premiere of Jörn Arnecke's Drei Helden in Rheinsberg, Gerhard Schedl's Triptychon, Dieter Kaufmann's Fuge Unfug-e, Elliott Carters What Next? and the world premiere of Péter Eötvös’ Paradise Reloaded at the Neue Oper Wien. Thereafter he was also asked to direct classical repertory such as Un ballo in maschera in Bremerhaven, Les contes d’Hoffmann and Cendrillon am Stadttheater Bern, Orfeo ed Euridice und Aida at the Oper Köln, Eugene Onegin in Mainz, La traviata and The Cunning Little Vixen at the Hamburg State Opera.

A long term cooperation was established with Graz Opera during the directorship of Elisabeth Sobotka (2009-2015). In Graz Erath directed Alban Berg's Lulu and Mozart's Don Giovanni (both 2010), Elektra by Hugo von Hofmannsthal und Richard Strauss (2012), Wagner's Lohengrin (2013) and Korngold's Die tote Stadt (2015). Especially Lohengrin — 2015 transferred to Oslo Opera — achieved high acclaim from public and press. Vienna's Kurier praised the direction as ″poetic, visually stunning and partially fairytale like.″ The costumes for this production were designed by French couturier Christian Lacroix with whom Erath had already created Aida in Cologne.

Since 2009, Erath regularly works at Oper Frankfurt. He debuted with Eötvös’ opera version of Angels in America in an outlet of the company, the Bockenheimer Depot. In the main opera house he presented Verdi's Otello in 2011, Händel's Giulio Cesare in Egitto in 2012 and Carl Maria von Weber's Euryanthe in April 2015. In June 2015 his mise-en-scène of Mozart's Le nozze di Figaro premiered at the  Semperoper in Dresden. He used elements from Commedia dell’arte at the beginning of the opera. kultiversum reported that Erath „placed the action in three historic settings: Firstly on a stylized wooden pedestal the archaic world of Commedia dell’Arte bringing into remembrance that Da Ponte based his personalities on this ancient typology. Secondly a classical baroque scenery representing late 18th century. Lastly the open stage of modern theatre breaking theatrical conventions also acoustically with spoken parts of dialogue and interspersing them with pits and parts of French chansons played on an accordion.“ The Frankfurter Allgemeine Zeitung described his interpretation as „Comedy of Losses“.

Erath belongs to the faculty of Berlin University of the Arts where he teaches Scenic Studies.

Quotes

Accolades 
 2008  for the production of Massenet's Cendrillon at the Stadttheater Bern

References

External links 

 Oper Köln, Scenes from Aida directed by Johannes Erath
Johannes Erath Operabase

1975 births
University of Music and Performing Arts Vienna alumni
Academic staff of the Berlin University of the Arts
People from Rottweil
German opera directors
Living people